Paulin Bruné (born 24 July 1946) is a politician from French Guiana who served in the French National Assembly from 1986-1988, and briefly in the European Parliament in 1986. 

Bruné was born in Cayenne, French Guiana, and holds a doctorate in Economics. He joined the Rally for the Republic, and was first elected in 1984. In 1986, he became deputy for French Guiana, and served until 1988.

References 

1946 births
Living people
People from Cayenne
French Guianan politicians
Rally for the Republic politicians
Deputies of the 8th National Assembly of the French Fifth Republic